William U. Hill (born February 16, 1948) is a former justice of the Wyoming Supreme Court, serving on the high from 1998–2018.

Hill received his Bachelor of Arts from the University of Wyoming in 1970 and was graduated from University of Wyoming College of Law in 1974. Earlier in his career, he served as both an Assistant United States Attorney and an Assistant Attorney General for Wyoming, and was engaged in private practice in Riverton, Wyoming, Seattle, Washington, and Cheyenne, Wyoming. He also served as Chief of Staff-Chief Counsel for Senator Malcolm Wallop in Washington, D.C. Hill served as chief justice from July 1, 2002, through June 30, 2006. He previously served as the state's Attorney General. He retired on February 16, 2018, upon turning 70.

References

External links
 Official Court Biography
http://votesmart.org/candidate/biography/59142/william-hill#.VCBpLywtCUk

1948 births
Living people
Politicians from Montgomery, Alabama
University of Wyoming alumni
University of Wyoming College of Law alumni
Justices of the Wyoming Supreme Court
Wyoming Attorneys General
Assistant United States Attorneys
20th-century American judges
21st-century American judges
Lawyers from Montgomery, Alabama
Chief Justices of the Wyoming Supreme Court